Gordon James Williams (born April 10, 1960) is a Canadian former professional ice hockey player. He played in two NHL games with the Philadelphia Flyers. He is the younger brother of Fred Williams.

External links
 

1960 births
Canadian ice hockey right wingers
Lethbridge Broncos players
Living people
Maine Mariners players
Sportspeople from Saskatoon
Philadelphia Flyers draft picks
Philadelphia Flyers players
Taber Golden Suns players
Ice hockey people from Saskatchewan